Jefferson Luiz do Nascimento de Souza (born June 27, 1989), known as Jefferson Souza or simply Jefferson, is a retired Brazilian footballer who played as a midfielder.

References

External links
  Santos FC
  ogol.com

1989 births
Living people
Brazilian footballers
Sportspeople from Rio de Janeiro (state)
Association football midfielders
Campeonato Brasileiro Série A players
Santos FC players
Associação Desportiva Cabofriense players
Associação Atlética Portuguesa (Santos) players
Esporte Clube Santo André players
Esporte Clube Tigres do Brasil players
Associação Atlética Anapolina players
Centro Educativo Recreativo Associação Atlética São Mateus players